M B Manik (1971 – 15 May 2014) was a notable Bangladeshi filmmaker. His directorial debut was Durdorsho. He made 36 films, including Kothin Prem, Prem Koyedi, Jaan Amar Jaan, Jaan Kurbaan, Ek Takar Denmohor, Bolo Na Tumi Amar, and Durdorsho Premik.

Films

Death
Manik was killed in a robbery in the United States. His family lived in the US. He owned a store out there as well. On 15 May 2014, people came to his shop asking for money. At one point of the heated conversation that ensued, he was shot by one of them. Critically injured, Manik was immediately taken to a hospital, but the doctors declared him dead. When his body was returned to his country, many Bangladeshi film actors and directors went to his residence and paid tribute. Manik is buried in his hometown of Feni, Bangladesh.

References

1971 births
2014 deaths
Bangladeshi filmmakers